The 2006 Bangkok International Film Festival was held from February 17 to February 27. The festival's events were held in the newly opened Siam Paragon, the first time all the festival's screenings, sidebar events, activities and film market were gathered under one roof.

The festival opened with the Asian premiere of Pen-Ek Ratanaruang's Invisible Waves. The closing film was Rent by Chris Columbus.

Celebrity highlights included director Terry Gilliam giving a master class, actor Christopher Lee giving a talk and introducing a screening of The Man with the Golden Gun, as well as appearances by Catherine Deneuve, Willem Dafoe, Tadanobu Asano, Rita Moreno, Rufus Sewell, director Oliver Stone and cinematographer Christopher Doyle.

Golden Kinnaree Awards

International Competition

Best Picture
 Water, directed by Deepa Mehta
The Consequences of Love, directed by Paolo Sorrentino  
The House of Sand, directed by Andrucha Waddington 
Invisible Waves, directed by Pen-Ek Ratanaruang 
Istanbul Tales, directed by Umit Unal, Kudret Sabanci, Elim Demirdelen, Yucel Yolcu and Omur Atay 
Mrs Henderson Presents, directed by Stephen Frears 
Ringfinger, directed by Diane Bertrand  
River Queen, directed by Vincent Ward  
Sympathy for Lady Vengeance by Park Chan-wook  
Transamerica, directed by Duncan Tucker 
Tsotsi, directed by Gavin Hood  
The White Masai, directed by Hermine Huntgeburth

Best Director
 Park Chan-Wook, Sympathy for Lady Vengeance

Best Actor
 Presley Chweneyagae, Tsotsi

Best Actress
 Felicity Huffman, Transamerica

Best ASEAN Film
Bride of Silence, directed by Đoàn Minh Phượng and Doàn Thanh Nghia  
3 Friends, directed by Mingmongkol Sonakul, Pumin Chinaradee and Aditya Assarat
Ahimsa: Stop to Run, directed by Kittikorn Laiwsirikun
The Burnt Theater, directed by Rithy Panh  
Gie, directed by Riri Riza  
Goalposts & Lipsticks, directed by Bernard Chauly  
The Gravel Road, directed by Deepak Kumaran Menon 
Janji Joni, directed by Joko Anwar  
Journey from the Fall, directed by Ham Tran  
Magdalena: The Unholy Saint, directed by Laurice Guillen 
The Masseur, directed by Brillante Mendoza   
Monday Morning Glory, directed by Woo Ming Jin
The Tin Mine, directed by Jira Maligool  
Unarmed Combat, directed by Han Yew Kwang

New Voices
Kept and Dreamless, directed by Vera Fogwill and Martin Desalvo 
A Common Thread, directed by Eléonore Faucher 
Dreaming Lhasa, directed by Ritu Sarin and Tenzing Sonam  
Go West, directed by Ahmed Imamovic  
The Intruder, directed by Frank Van Mechelen 
Kissed By Winter, directed by Sara Johnsen 
The Married Woman, directed by Pradeep Sarkar  
Milarepa: Revenge, directed by Neten Chokling 
On My Skin, directed by Valerio Jalongo  
Parzania, directed by Rahul Dholakia   
Reaching Silence, directed by Jahar Kanungo  
Ryna, directed by Ruxandra Zenide  
The Sacred Family, directed by Sebastián Campos Watt 
Season of the Horse, directed by Ning Cai  
Sophie Scholl – The Final Days, directed by Marc Rothemund  
Stoned!, directed by Steven Woolley  
Three Dots, directed by Roya Sadat

Best Documentary
Rize, directed by David LaChapelle 
Honorable mention - Ballets Russes, directed by Dayna Goldfine and Dan Geller 
Honorable mention - In the Shadow of the Palms, directed by Wayne Coles-Janess 
Africa United, directed by Ólaf Jóhannesson 
Before the Flood, directed by Li Yifan and Yan Yu 
Crossing the Bridge: The Sound of Istanbul, directed by Fatih Akın
Linda & Ali, Two Worlds Within Four Walls, directed by Lut Vandekeybus 
Nice Hat! 5 Enigmas in the Life of Cambodia, directed by David Brisbin 
Switch Off (Apaga y vámonos), directed by Manel Mayol 
The Art of Flight, directed by Davin Anders Hutchins 
The Giant Buddhas, directed by Christian Frei 
The Stories from the North, directed by Uruphong Raksasad 
Vajra Sky Over Tibet, directed by John Bush

Special Awards
 Jameson Best Asian Short Film –  Under Construction, directed by Lee Hyung-Suk
 Jameson People's Choice Award – Art of the Devil 2, directed by Kongkiat Khomsiri, Art Thamthrakul, Yosapong Polsap, Putipong Saisikaew, Isara Nadee, Pasith Buranajan and Seree Pongniti 
 Jury Mention –  Istanbul Tales, directed by Umit Unal, Kudret Sabanci, Elim Demirdelen, Yucel Yolcu and Omur Atay 
 Award for Outstanding Contribution to the Promotion of Asian Cinema – Wouter Barendrecht and Michael J. Werner of Fortissimo Films.
Crystal Lens Award – Anthony Dod Mantle
Career Achievement Award – Catherine Deneuve
Lifetime Achievement Award – Sombat Metanee

Controversy
Ahead of the 2006 festival, Somsak Techaratanaprasert, the president of the Federation of National Film Associations of Thailand, called for a boycott of the festival by group members, because festival organizers, the Tourism Authority of Thailand, had not included Federation in the film-selection process and marketing plans for the festival, as it had in past years. Member film studios Five Star Production, GTH and RS Promotion did not agree with the boycott, which led to Somsak, also the chief executive of Sahamongkol Film International, to resign as chairman of the Federation. But as a result of the boycott, some films produced or distributed by Sahamongkol were pulled from the festival program.

References

External links 
2006 BKKIFF's Official website
2006 BKKIFF's Korean website

2006
2006 in Thailand
2006 film festivals
2006 festivals in Asia
2006 in Bangkok